233 (two hundred [and] thirty-three) is the natural number following 232 and preceding 234.

Additionally:

233 is a prime number,
233 is a Sophie Germain prime, a Pillai prime, and a Ramanujan prime.
It is a Fibonacci number, one of the Fibonacci primes.
There are exactly 233 maximal planar graphs with ten vertices, and 233 connected topological spaces with four points.

References

Integers